Greyhound Park also known as Angle Park is the only greyhound racing venue located in Adelaide, South Australia. The venue is owned and operated by Greyhound Racing South Australia (GRSA) and has an approximate capacity of around 4,000. The track is on Cardigan Street in the northwestern suburb of Angle Park.

Facilities include the Chasers Restaurant, at 55 Cardigan Street and there are full Totalisator Agency Board (TAB) facilities and bookmakers on site with race meetings taking place on Monday and Thursday nights and Wednesday mornings.

History
The Adelaide Greyhound Racing Club held its first registered meeting with full betting facilities on 20 April 1972.

In May 1990 the track underwent a series of improvements which included the addition of a track view restaurant, bistro and lounge bar. Four years later GRSA (with some assistance of government funding) purchased the freehold of a section of the Harold Tyler Reserve which included the race track.

The track has hosted the Adelaide Cup since 1972. The event was previously held at Waterloo Corner from 1956 and then Bolivar.

Adelaide Cup
Past winners

+ held twice in January and October

References

1972 establishments in Australia
Sports venues in Adelaide
Sports venues completed in 1972
Greyhound racing venues in Australia